Jeffrey Hunter (born Henry Herman McKinnies Jr.; November 25, 1926 – May 27, 1969) was an American film and television actor and producer known for his roles in films such as The Searchers and King of Kings. On television, Hunter is known for his 1965 role as Captain Christopher Pike in the original pilot episode of Star Trek and the later use of that footage in the episode "The Menagerie".

Early life
Hunter was born in New Orleans, Louisiana, the son of Edith Lois (née Burgess) and Henry Herman McKinnies. His family was of Scottish ancestry. After 1930, he was reared in Milwaukee, Wisconsin, where he graduated from Whitefish Bay High School. He was very involved in school sports, and began acting in local theater and radio in his early teens. He worked for station WTMJ-FM and the Children's Theatre of the Air, sponsored by the Wauwatosa School Board.

From 1942 to 1945, he spent his summers appearing in small roles for a touring summer-stock theater company from New York called the Northport Players. He made his professional radio debut in his senior year in high school on a program called Those Who Serve, playing a G.I. After graduating from high school in 1945, Hunter joined the United States Navy. He completed a naval radar course at the Radio Technical School and was assigned to Communications Division, Headquarters of the Ninth Naval District in Great Lakes, Illinois. He did not see any battle duty, due to a broken arch-bone suffered in a high-school football injury.

College
During World War II, Hunter served in the Navy. After the war, he attended Northwestern University from which he graduated in 1949. Here, he was a member of Phi Delta Theta fraternity.

In college, Hunter appeared in two NU stage productions, including Ruth Gordon's Years Ago (as Captain Absolute). He also acted with the NU Theatre summer-stock company at Eagles Mere, Pennsylvania, in 1947, appearing in Too Many Husbands, The Late George Apley, Payment Deferred, The Merchant of Venice, and Fata Morgana. He did radio work with the NU Radio Workshop and Radio Guild, and worked summers with the NBC Radio Institute in Chicago.

Hunter's first film role came in 1949. While at NU, he was one of a number of students who were cast in David Bradley's version of  Julius Caesar (1950). The movie is best remembered today for starring a young Charlton Heston as Mark Antony.

He graduated from NU on August 26, 1949, then moved to the University of California at Los Angeles to get his master's degree in radio. In 1950, he was appearing in a college production of All My Sons (in the role of Chris) and was spotted by talent scouts from 20th Century Fox and Paramount. Paramount tested him - doing two scenes from All My Sons with Ed Begley. They were impressed and offered him an option; Darryl F. Zanuck of Fox heard about this and offered him a long-term contract. The young actor agreed and the studio changed his name to "Jeffrey Hunter" on June 1, 1950.

20th Century Fox
Fox started off Hunter in a small role in Fourteen Hours (1951), shot in New York City for director Henry Hathaway;  Debra Paget and he were two young people who connect while watching a man about to jump off a ledge. He had a two-minute scene in Call Me Mister (1951), then was given a bigger part in the all-male war movie The Frogmen (1951) for director Lewis Milestone, supporting Richard Widmark and Dana Andrews; among his fellow support players was Robert Wagner, another young male under contract to Fox at the time — the two actors would appear in several movies together and were often rivals for the same part. Hunter was then a "campus Casanova" in a Jeanne Crain drama, Take Care of My Little Girl (1952), directed by Jean Negulesco.

Leading man
Fan response to these appearances was positive, and Hunter moved into leading roles with Red Skies of Montana (1952), billed third in a film about smokejumpers with Richard Widmark. He had a more conventional male juvenile lead in Belles on Their Toes (1953), a sequel to Cheaper by the Dozen, which reunited him with Crain.

Marilyn Monroe later gave an interview where she discussed Hunter's appeal: 
To me, Jeff is the acme of young American manhood. Why, he looks like he just stepped off a college campus. He's extremely handsome, but this is not what impresses me. He has sort of — well, an all-encompassing type of magnetism. And he's a walking advertisement for marriage. You can't be with Jeff more than two minutes without realizing that he takes his marriage seriously, and adores his wife and child. He talks about them constantly, and with extreme pride ...  You would be certain to guess, even without knowing, that Jeff is the real athletic type. He likes to ski especially, and can you think of anyone who would look better soaring down a mountain? 
Fox gave Hunter his first starring role in Lure of the Wilderness (1952), a remake of Swamp Water, directed by Negulesco and opposite Jean Peters. After Dreamboat (1952), where Hunter supported Clifton Webb and Ginger Rogers, he was given his best role yet, the starring part in a war film, Sailor of the King (1953), based on C. S. Forester's book, Brown on Resolution. Although financed by Fox, it was essentially a British film, with British talent — Hunter was cast as a Canadian to explain his accent (his casting led to some difficulties with British film unions).

Sailor of the King was a minor success, as was a Western Hunter made with Mitzi Gaynor, Three Young Texans (1954). Princess of the Nile (1954) was an "Eastern" with Debra Paget in the title role.  It was not particularly successful, either, and Hunter did not manage to transition into being a top-line star. The title role in Prince Valiant, which had been mentioned for him, was given to Robert Wagner. "It was a terrible disappointment to me," said Hunter later. "I just didn't know what to do. It seemed my career was over. They were making a lot of pictures on the lot, but I wasn't cast in any of them and I couldn't understand why, particularly since I started out with such a terrific lot of luck."

Career lull
Fox lent him out, along with Debra Paget, to Allied Artists to play the abolitionist Owen Brown in Seven Angry Men (1955), with Raymond Massey in the lead.

Hunter then played an Indian chief in the Western, White Feather (1955), essentially supporting Robert Wagner. It was a moderate hit at the box office. Hunter said after it, "I had no immediate pictures scheduled ...  Nothing seemed to be coming up. I wasn't thinking of leaving my studio — it's important having a major studio behind you. It was just that I was restless, and nothing seemed to be happening."

With a friend, Bill Hayes, he set up a production company, Hunter Enterprises. They produced a documentary, The Living Swamp. Hunter also began appearing regularly on television, having particular success in an episode of Climax! he made with Margaret O'Brien. Back at Fox, he supported Anthony Quinn in Seven Cities of Gold (1955).

He was lent to United Artists along with fellow Fox contract players Wagner and Joanne Woodward for A Kiss Before Dying (1956). Wagner had the best role —as a killer—while Hunter had the more conventional leading-man part. (The movie was shelved for a year before being released.) A loan-out to co-star with John Wayne in the title roles of the now-classic Western The Searchers (1956) began the first of three pictures he made with director John Ford, followed by The Last Hurrah (1958) and Sergeant Rutledge (1960).

The Searchers

Hunter's career was revitalized when he successfully lobbied John Ford to cast him as the second lead in The Searchers (1956), supporting John Wayne.

Disney borrowed him to play William Allen Fuller in the Civil War action movie The Great Locomotive Chase (1956), opposite Fess Parker. Ironically, according to Parker's Archive of American Television interview, Ford had originally wanted to cast Parker in Hunter's role in The Searchers, but Disney refused to lend him out, something Parker did not hear about until years later; Parker referred to this lost opportunity as his single biggest career setback.

The success of The Searchers and The Great Locomotive Chase reignited Fox's interest in Hunter and the studio resigned him, while giving him the right to make one "outside" film a year.

He supported Robert Ryan in a Western, The Proud Ones (1956). Hunter went over to Universal Studios and supported another older star, Fred MacMurray, in another Western, Gun for a Coward (1957), in a role originally meant for James Dean.  Back at Fox, Hunter was reunited with Wagner as the James brothers in The True Story of Jesse James (1957), directed by Nicholas Ray (Hunter played Frank); it was mildly popular, although considered a critical disappointment.

Fox gave him a leading role in The Way to the Gold (1957), another Western. It was a low-budget production, but proved profitable. He was one of several leads in Fox's look at young people, No Down Payment (1957) - not a big hit, but the early work for director Martin Ritt received some critical acclaim. Fox sent Hunter to Britain to be an American star in a British war film once more: Count Five and Die (1957).

Illness
Hunter was meant to make a movie for Universal, If I Should Die (later Appointment with a Shadow), but collapsed on his return from Europe; he was replaced by George Nader. He was off the screen for 14 months while ill with what was diagnosed as hepatitis.

John Ford cast him in another film, The Last Hurrah (1958), starring Spencer Tracy. He had a cameo as himself in the Pat Boone musical at Fox, Mardi Gras (1958).

Hunter then made a war film, In Love and War (1958), co-starring with several other Fox signees such as Wagner. It proved popular.

Hunter formed a production company, Mexico Films, and made a film in Mexico, The Holy City, The Sacred City. It struggled to find a release.

John Ford used him for a third (and final) time as the lead in the Western legal drama Sergeant Rutledge (1960) starring Woody Strode, and the film was not a big success.

Hunter was in an urban thriller, Key Witness (1960), directed by Phil Karlson. After making the film, Fox did not renew its contract with Hunter.

Career after Fox
Hunter's next film was with Karlson; he played Guy Gabaldon in the Allied Artists film Hell to Eternity (1960), which was a hit at the box office. (Gabaldon later named one of his sons Jeffrey Hunter Gabaldon.)

King of Kings

Nicholas Ray cast Hunter in the role of Jesus Christ in the $8 million epic King of Kings (1961), produced by Samuel Bronston. "I've broken my shackles at last," said Hunter at the time. He told Louella Parsons, "Christ was a carpenter and 33 years old, and I am 33, and I suppose my physical measurements fitted the description in the New Testament. At the time of His death, He was robust, and not a delicate man."

It was a difficult part, met by critical reaction that ranged from praise to ridicule. Hunter's youthful matinee-idol looks resulted in the film being derided as I Was a Teenage Jesus, despite the actor's age at the time. However, it was a big hit at the box office and remains one of Hunter's best-remembered roles. Hunter reflected two years after the film came out, "I still get an average of 1,500 letters a month from people who saw me in that film and share the beauty and inspiration I derived from it with me. There are some things that can't be measured in dollars and cents and how can anyone put a price—even the price of a million-dollar career—on the role of the greatest Being this mortal world has ever known?"

When Hunter returned to Hollywood, he deliberately selected parts that were different - a psychopathic killer in an episode of Checkmate, and as the lead in a heist thriller Man-Trap (1961), directed by actor Edmond O'Brien.

At Universal, he starred as another real-life figure from World War II, No Man Is an Island (1962), the story of George Ray Tweed. For his old Fox boss Darryl F. Zanuck, he joined an all-star cast in the World War II battle epic The Longest Day. Hunter provided a climactic heroic moment playing a sergeant who is killed while leading a successful attempt to breach the defense wall atop Omaha Beach in Normandy.

He headed to Italy to make Gold for the Caesars (1963) with director Andre DeToth. He was set to co-star with Spencer Tracy and James Stewart in The Long Flight when he received an offer to appear in a TV show.

Temple Houston

Having guest-starred on television dramas since the mid-1950s, Hunter was then offered a two-year contract by Warner Bros. studio boss Jack Warner that included starring as circuit-riding Texas lawyer Temple Lea Houston, the youngest son of Sam Houston, in the NBC series Temple Houston (1963–1964), which Hunter's production company co-produced.

Star Trek
Temple Houston did not survive beyond 26 weeks, and in 1964, Hunter accepted the lead role of Captain Christopher Pike in "The Cage", the first pilot episode of Star Trek.  It was completed in early 1965 (with a copyright date of 1964). Clegg Hoyt, Hunter's co-star in The True Story of Jesse James, appeared in this pilot as Pitcairn, the transporter chief of the USS Enterprise. Hunter declined to film a second Star Trek pilot requested by NBC in 1965, and decided to concentrate on motion pictures. He told the press, "I was asked to do it, but had I accepted, I would have been tied up much longer than I care to be. I have several things brewing now and they should be coming to a head in the next few weeks. I love doing motion pictures and expect to be as busy as I want to be in
them." Footage from the original pilot was subsequently adapted into a two-part episode titled "The Menagerie". The character of Pike made a reappearance in this episode, but Hunter was neither affordable nor available to reprise his role, so a different actor was used, explained by having Pike disfigured.

Later that year, Hunter filmed the pilot for another NBC series, the espionage thriller Journey into Fear, which the network did not pick up.

Later career
With the demise of the studio contract system in the early 1960s and the outsourcing of much feature production, Hunter, like many other leading men of the 1950s, found work in B movies produced in Italy, Hong Kong, and Mexico, with the occasional television guest part in Hollywood.

His films included Brainstorm (1965), a thriller directed by William Conrad; Murieta (1965), a Western shot in Spain; Dimension 5 (1965), a spy film; the Hong Kong-shot Strange Portrait (1966), which was never released; and A Witch without a Broom (1967), a comedy fantasy set in Spain.  He guest-starred on  Insight, Daniel Boone, and The FBI.

After a cameo in A Guide for the Married Man (1967), he had the lead in a Western shot in Spain for Sidney W. Pink, The Christmas Kid (1967). Hunter had a better part in Custer of the West (1968), also shot in Spain, supporting Robert Shaw in the title role; Hunter played Frederick Benteen.

Back in Hollywood, he supported Bob Hope in The Private Navy of Sgt. O'Farrell (1968). He returned to low-budget films; Find a Place to Die (1968) was a spaghetti Western, although  Hunter at least had the lead. He made some Italian films, Sexy Susan Sins Again (1968) and Cry Chicago (1969), and was set to make A Band of Brothers with Vince Edwards when he died.

Personal life
Hunter's first marriage from 1950 to 1955 to actress Barbara Rush produced a son, Christopher (born 1952). From 1957 to 1967, Hunter was married to model Dusty Bartlett. He adopted her son, Steele, and the couple had two other children, Todd and Scott. In February 1969, just three months before his death, he married actress Emily McLaughlin.

Hunter was a Republican.

Death
While in Spain in November 1968 to film Cry Chicago (¡Viva América!), a story about the Chicago Mafia, Hunter was injured in an on-set explosion when a car window near him, which had been rigged to explode outward, accidentally exploded inward.  Hunter sustained a serious concussion. According to Hunter's wife Emily, he "went into shock" on the flight back to the United States after filming and "couldn't speak. He could hardly move." After landing, Hunter was taken to Good Samaritan Hospital in Los Angeles, but doctors could not find any serious injuries except  for a displaced vertebra and a concussion.

On the afternoon of May 26, 1969, Hunter suffered an intracranial hemorrhage while walking down a three-stair set of steps at his home in Van Nuys, California. He fell, knocked over a planter, and struck his head on the banister, fracturing his skull.  He was found unconscious by Frank Bellow, an actor and a friend of Hunter's, who came for a visit, and taken to Valley Presbyterian Hospital, where he underwent brain surgery.  He died at about 9:30 the following morning at the age of 42.

Hunter's funeral was held at St Mark's Episcopal Church in Van Nuys on May 31. He was interred at Glen Haven Memorial Park, in Sylmar, California.

Filmography

References

External links
 

 Tribute site to Jeffrey Hunter
 

1926 births
1969 deaths
20th Century Studios contract players
Accidental deaths from falls
Accidental deaths in California
20th-century American male actors
American male film actors
American male television actors
American television producers
Warner Bros. contract players
Northwestern University School of Communication alumni
Male actors from New Orleans
Male actors from Milwaukee
Male Western (genre) film actors
University of California, Los Angeles alumni
United States Navy officers
United States Navy personnel of World War II
Burials in California
20th-century American businesspeople
California Republicans
American Episcopalians
Film producers from Wisconsin
Film producers from Louisiana
Whitefish Bay High School alumni
American people of Scottish descent
Deaths from intracranial haemorrhage